Lime Peak is a summit in Cochise County, Arizona, north of Interstate 10 between Benson and Willcox and  northwest of Dragoon, Arizona. It is one of three named peak in the Little Dragoon Mountains. Two of the peaks are named the Mae West Peaks since there appearance was thought to be reminiscent of the figure of the actress Mae West.

In 1935 the Coast And Geodetic Survey referred to the tallest of the Mae West peaks as Lime. In 1984 the U.S. Board on Geographic Names officially assigned the name Lime Peak to its current location. It had also been known as Johnson Peak.

References 

Landforms of Cochise County, Arizona
Mountains of Arizona
Mountains of Cochise County, Arizona
North American 2000 m summits